The coal towns, or "coal camps" of Mingo County, West Virginia were situated to exploit the area's rich coal seams. Many of these towns were located in deep ravines that afforded direct access to the coal through the hillsides, allowing mined coal to be dropped or conveyed downhill to railway lines at the valley floor. Many of these encampments were set up as coal towns, and when their mines closed, the towns vanished.  Mingo County covers  the Williamson Coalfield and a small portion of the Logan Coalfield.
Below is partial listing of known coal towns within the Williamson Coalfield and a small portion of the Logan Coalfield. Further listings are available here

Williamson Coalfield

 Blocton
 Borderland  (abandoned)
 Burch (abandoned)
 Cedar (abandoned)
 Chattaroy
 Cinderella
 Delbarton
 Glen Alum
 Greyeagle
 Kermit
 Lenore
 Lobata  (abandoned)
 Matewan
 North Matewan
 Puritan Mines
 Ragland
 Rawl (abandoned)
 Red Jacket
 Sprigg (abandoned)
 Thacker
 Vulcan
 War Eagle
 Williamson

Logan Coalfield

 Gilbert
 Tamcliff

References

Pocahontas Coalfield
Geography of Mingo County, West Virginia
Ghost towns in West Virginia